Montevallo is a city in Alabama.

Montevallo may also refer to:
Montevallo, Missouri, an unincorporated community
Montevallo Township, Vernon County, Missouri
Montevallo (album), 2014 album by Sam Hunt
Montevallo (crater), a crater on Mars